Retinol dehydrogenase 16 (all-trans) is a protein that in humans is encoded by the RDH16 gene. The gene is also known as RODH-4 and SDR9C8.

Model organisms

			
Model organisms have been used in the study of RDH16 function. A conditional knockout mouse line, called Rdh16tm1a(KOMP)Wtsi was generated as part of the International Knockout Mouse Consortium program — a high-throughput mutagenesis project to generate and distribute animal models of disease to interested scientists — at the Wellcome Trust Sanger Institute.

Male and female animals underwent a standardized phenotypic screen to determine the effects of deletion. Twenty four tests were carried out on mutant mice, but no significant abnormalities were observed.

References

Further reading 
 

Human proteins
Genes mutated in mice